Mannakee is a surname. Notable people with the surname include:

 Barry Mannakee (1947–1987), British police officer and bodyguard to Diana, Princess of Wales
 Nathan Mannakee (1879–1965), American college football coach